Dr Hugh Shields (8 September 1929 – 16 July 2008) was an authority on Irish traditional music and a founder member of the Folk Music Society of Ireland and the Irish Traditional Music Archive. He was also a senior lecturer in French at Trinity College, Dublin. He wrote a number of works on Irish music and folklore.

Early life and academic career
Shields was born in Belfast and attended the Royal Belfast Academical Institution. He won a scholarship to Trinity College, Dublin, where he specialized in French and Spanish. He became a junior lecturer there in 1954 and a full lecturer in 1965. 
After his retirement in 1994 he continued teaching for another four years in the school of music, where he had worked part-time since 1982.

In 1953, Shields first met the traditional singer Eddie Butcher and started collecting traditional music. He also collaborated with the Dublin collector Tom Munnelly, and edited his recordings for several record companies and for the Ulster Folk and Transport Museum. Shields also contributed articles to a number of national and international journals.

Folk Music Society of Ireland

Shields was a founder member of the Folk Music Society of Ireland or FMSI. He was its first honorary secretary, and edited both the society's journal and newsletter. The society was founded in Dublin in April 1971, with the aims of encouraging interest and promoting research in the traditional music, song and dance of Ireland. It was involved in organising a programme of public lectures, recitals and seminars. By 2003, the society brought its main activities to an end, though it continued to act in its publishing capacity, and maintained an archival website of digitised material.

The society's publications included its journal, Éigse Cheol Tíre / Irish Folk Music Studies (ISSN 0332-298X), and a newsletter titled Ceol Tíre. The latter was published from November 1973, initially with Shields as editor, and continued by him and Nicholas Carolan (who was secretary of the society 1977–1992) until December 1989. The 33 issues of the newsletter have subsequently been made available as PDF downloads from the FMSI and Irish Traditional Music Archive websites. Books and collections published by the FMSI include, A short discography of Irish folk music (1987) by Nicholas Carolan, and Blas: the local accent in Irish traditional music (1995) edited by Thérèse Smith and Mícheál Ó Súilleabháin.

Publications 
A number of books on Irish folk music, songs and musical history were edited by Shields and published by the FMSI. These include:

 Shamrock, Rose and Thistle: Folk Singing in North Derry (1981)
Old Dublin songs, ed. Hugh Shields, 1988.  (out of print but pdf download now available from FMSI website)
Chants corréziens—French folk songs from Corrèze, collected & ed. Hugh Shields, 1988, booklet & audiocassette. ISBN 0--9524197-0X (pdf download of booklet now available from FMSI website)
Ballad research. The stranger in ballad narrative and other topics. Papers read at the European Ballad Conference.Dublin 1985, ed. Hugh Shields, 297 pp. (1986).  
Popular music in 18th-century Dublin (articles by Brian Boydell, Breandán Breathnach,  Nicholas Carolan and Hugh Shields, 1985, out of print)
A short bibliography of Irish folk song, by Hugh Shields (1985)

References

1929 births
2008 deaths
Irish musicologists
Irish folk-song collectors
Musicians from Belfast
Academics of Trinity College Dublin
Alumni of Trinity College Dublin
20th-century musicologists